Čika Dača Stadium is a multi-use stadium in Kragujevac, Serbia.  It is currently used mostly for football matches and is the home ground of FK Radnički 1923. The stadium was named in memory of Danilo Stojanović, known as Čika Dača, who is considered to be a pioneer of football in Serbia.

History

The construction of the stadium began in November 1949 and took eight years for various reasons. Finally, the club's new football home was finished on 6 June 1957. The newly built stadium has received 30,000 spectators and the first game which was played on, was between Radnički Kragujevac and Partizan Belgrade and it ended 2-2. The largest attendance in a Yugoslav First League game was on 24 August 1969 when Radnički played against Hajduk Split in front of a crowd of 35,000. The largest attendance ever recorded in the stadium took place in 1969 when Radnički played a friendly match against Santos at which 40,000 spectators came to watch the legendary Pelé play in Yugoslavia for the first time.

In 2007, 15,100 new seats were installed in the stadium. The games can be only played during a day in the stadium as it doesn't have floodlights.

New stadium plans 
In May 2023, the construction works of a new 20,000 seater stadium are expected to start. It's expected to cost .

Concerts
 Zdravko Čolić - 6 July 2004
 Svetlana Raznatović  performed a concert as part of her Poziv Tour in front of 18,000 people, promoting her album Poziv - 14 September 2013.

Gallery

See also

 List of stadiums in Serbia

References 

Football venues in Serbia
Football venues in Serbia and Montenegro
Athletics (track and field) venues in Serbia and Montenegro
Football venues in Yugoslavia
Athletics (track and field) venues in Yugoslavia
Sport in Kragujevac
Buildings and structures in Kragujevac
Multi-purpose stadiums in Serbia
FK Radnički 1923